Trm10p may refer to:

 TRNA (adenine9-N1)-methyltransferase, an enzyme
 TRNA (guanine9-N1)-methyltransferase, an enzyme